Phenyl glycidyl ether, is a liquid aromatic organic chemical in the glycidyl ether class of compounds. It has the formula C9H10O2. It has the CAS Registry Number 122-60-1 and the IUPAC name of 2-(phenoxymethyl)oxirane. A key use is in the viscosity reduction of epoxy resin systems. It is REACH registered and on EINECS under the name 2,3-epoxypropyl phenyl ether.

Manufacture
Phenol and epichlorohydrin are reacted in the presence of a base and not a Lewis acid catalyst as normal with glycidyl ethers. A halohydrin is formed. This is followed by washing with sodium hydroxide in dehydrochlorination step. This forms phenyl glycidyl ether. The waste products are water and sodium chloride and excess caustic soda. One of the quality control tests would involve measuring the Epoxy value by determination of the epoxy equivalent weight.

Other names
 phenyl glycidyl ether
 phenol glycidyl ether
 1,2-Epoxy-3-phenoxypropane
 1-Phenoxy-2,3-epoxypropane
 2,3-Epoxy-1-phenoxypropane
 2,3-Epoxypropyl phenyl ether
 3-phenoxy-1,2-epoxypropane
 benzene, (2,3-epoxypropoxy)-
 Ether, 2,3-epoxypropyl phenyl
 Glycidyl phenyl ether
 Oxirane, (phenoxymethyl)-
 propane, 1,2-epoxy-3-phenoxy-

Uses
It has been used for carbon dioxide absorption and other chemical reactions in addition to its use of reducing viscosity of epoxy resins. It undergoes anionic polymerization. It is one of a number of glycidyl ethers available commercially that are used to reduce the viscosity of epoxy resins. These are then further used in coatings, sealants, adhesives and elastomers. The use of the diluent does effect mechanical properties and microstructure of epoxy resins.

Toxicology
It has caused cancer in laboratory animals. It is also listed as a California Proposition 65 chemical. It is specifically mentioned by OSHA.

See also
 Epoxide
 Glycidol

References

Further reading

External links

  Safety Data Sheet
  Phenyl glycidyl ether supplier distributor parchem

Glycidyl ethers
Reactive diluents